Blue Omega Entertainment was an American film and video game company, located in Annapolis, Maryland.

History
Founded in 2003, the company has made two horror films, Dark Ride and Danika, and developed Damnation, which was published by Codemasters.  Blue Omega was dismantled on June 26, 2009, due to the commercial failure of Damnation.

References

Video game companies established in 2003
Video game companies disestablished in 2009
Mass media companies established in 2003
Mass media companies disestablished in 2009
Defunct film and television production companies of the United States
Video game development companies
Defunct video game companies of the United States
Defunct companies based in Maryland
2003 establishments in Maryland
2009 disestablishments in Maryland